The 2021 New York Excelsior season will be the fourth season of New York Excelsior's (NYXL) existence in the Overwatch League and their first under head coach Lee "WhyNot" Ju-hyeop.

Preceding offseason

Roster changes 

The NYXL entered free agency with seven free agents, all of which became free agents due to the team not exercising the option to retain the player for another year.

Acquisitions 
The Excelsior's first offseason acquisition was Jo "Yakpung" Gyeong-mu, a tank player coming off of an Overwatch Contenders Korea championship with O2 Blast who signed on December 11, 2020. Six days later, they signed rookie Lee "Friday" Seung-woo, a "skilled and flexible" support player coming from Contenders team OZ Gaming. On December 22, the team announced the signing of four damage players: Jo "FEATH5R" Min-jae, a rookie coming from OZ Gaming, Lim "Flora" Young-woo, a rookie hitscan player coming from Contenders team Team Diamond, Kim "Gwangboong" Gwang-won, another rookie hitscan player coming from Contenders team Team Cat, and Lee "Ivy" Seung-hyun, a veteran who was "one of the most flexible and deadly" damage players with the Philadelphia Fusion in 2020.

Departures 
The Excelsior released two of their contracted players on October 22, 2020: damage player Jeong "Nenne" Yeon-gwan and tank player Choi "Hotba" Hong-jun. Six of the NYXL's seven free agents did not return, three of which signed with other teams, beginning with tank player Kim "Mano" Dong-gyu signing with the Philadelphia Fusion on November 2. On November 29, support player Jung "Anamo" Tae-sung and tank player Park "Saebyeolbe" Jong-ryeol signed with the Seoul Dynasty. Damage players Kim "Haksal" Hyo-jong and Lee "WhoRU" Seung-jun both announced their retirements in the offseason. The team's final free agent, damage player Kim "Libero" Hae-seong did not sign with a team in the offseason.

Final roster

Transactions 
Transactions of/for players on the roster during the 2021 regular season:
On June 30, the Excelsior signed tank player Shin "Kalios" Woo-yeol.
On July 16, damage player Lee "Ivy" Seung-hyun retired.

Standings

Game log

Regular season 

|2021 season schedule

References 

New York Excelsior
New York Excelsior
New York Excelsior seasons